Eva Valley is a rural locality in the Coomalie Shire, Northern Territory, Australia.

The locality was originally a large property known as Banyan Farm, but it was sold to the Childs family during the 1960s and renamed Eva Valley after one of the new owners, Eva Childs. The name has been retained with the subdivision of the area.

References

Populated places in the Northern Territory